Aleksandar Vezenkov (born 6 August 1995), most commonly known as Sasha Vezenkov, is a professional basketball player for Olympiacos of the Greek Basket League and the EuroLeague. He is a 2.06 m (6 ft 9 in) tall  power forward who can also play as a small forward. Vezenkov was born in Cyprus, but due to his Bulgarian descent, he represents the Bulgarian national team.  He won the Bulgarian Sportsperson of the Year award in 2022, which made him the second basketball player to win the award after Vanya Voynova in 1958. He holds triple citizenship for Bulgaria, Cyprus and Greece.

Early career
He was born in Nicosia to Bulgarian parents and was raised in Cyprus and Greece. The family came from the West Macedonian village of Tresonče (today North Macedonia), who emigrated to Bulgaria in the course of the Balkan Wars (see Macedonian Bulgarians).

Vezenkov, who was always considered to be one of the best youth players in Europe in his age group, began playing youth club basketball in Cyprus in 2005 with APOEL Nicosia's youth teams. In 2009, at the age of 14, he moved to Greece and began playing youth club basketball with Aris' youth teams, until 2011, when he joined Aris' senior men's club. He trained for several years at Nick Galis Hall, located near the center of Thessaloniki, Greece.

On 16 May 2013, Vezenkov committed to play American college basketball in the Big East Conference, at Xavier University, with the Xavier Musketeers. However, he ultimately decided to stay in Greece with his club team Aris instead.

Professional career

Aris (2011–2015) 
Vezenkov began his pro career with the senior men's team of Aris, in the Greek League, in 2011, appearing in 10 games, with an average of 2.5 minutes on the floor. In the 2012–13 season, he appeared in 21 games, averaging 3.9 points and 2.5 rebounds per game. He was named the Greek League Best Young Player in 2013.

In August 2013, he re-signed with Aris for 3 years. In the next season, he established himself in the team, appeared in 26 games and averaged 11.1 points, 5.8 rebounds, 2.1 assists, and 0.9 steals per game. He was named the Greek League Best Young Player again in 2014. In the local derby against rivals PAOK, during the 2014–15 season, Vezenkov achieved Greek League career-highs in scoring and rebounding, with 29 points and 14 rebounds respectively. 

During 26 regular season games, Vezenkov led the league in total points scored, with 469, and was second in total rebounds grabbed, with 201. In total, he played in 37 games during the 2014–15 Greek Basket League season, averaging 16.8 points, 7.3 rebounds, and 1.6 assists per game. He was the league's official full-season leader in scoring and rebounding. He was also named the league's MVP, Most Improved Player, and Best Young Player that season. Vezenkov had originally planned to enter the 2015 NBA draft, but later withdrew his name from it before the deadline that was set for international players back in June.

Barcelona (2015–2018) 
On 31 July 2015, Vezenkov signed a four-year deal (with the 4th year being optional) worth €2 million net income, with the Spanish ACB League club FC Barcelona. FC Barcelona also paid a €315,000 buyout fee to Vezenkov's former club, Aris. Vezenkov's contract with FC Barcelona also included a buyout option for the NBA, set at the amount of €1 million euros. The Spanish League club Valencia Basket, and the Greek League club Panathinaikos, also were interested in signing Vezenkov to a contract at the time. Vezenkov would then put his name in the 2016 NBA draft, after his first season with Barcelona ended. However, he wound up removing his name from the draft on the 13 June 2016, deadline for international players.

With Barcelona, Vezenkov won the Spanish Supercup title in 2015, and was named to the all Spanish League All-Young Players Team of the 2016–17 season. On 29 June 2018, Barcelona parted ways with him.

Olympiacos (2018–present) 
On 12 July 2018, Vezenkov signed a two-year deal with Olympiacos of the EuroLeague.

On 10 July 2020, Vezenkov signed a two-year extension with the team. He recorded his EuroLeague career-high on 18 March 2021, scoring 31 points in an 80-84 win at Alba Berlin.

In the 2021–22 season, Vezenkov established himself as a regular starter at Olympiacos. On 20 February 2022, he recorded 18 points and 13 rebounds in the Greek Cup Final against arch-rivals Panathinaikos, helping the club win its first title after 6 years. He was also named Euroleague February MVP, playing an important role in Olympiacos finishing 2nd in the Euroleague Regular Season with a 19-9 record, the club's best ever finish. On 27 April 2022, he scored 17 points and grabbed 9 rebounds in the 83-87 road win, in Game 3 of the playoff series against Monaco, helping his team regain homecourt advantage and eventually qualify to the EuroLeague Final Four, for the first time after 2017. He finished the EuroLeague season averaging 13.7 points, 5.9 rebounds and a Performance Index Rating of 17.8. His performance earned him a spot in the All-Euroleague First Team. On 17 June 2022, in Game 3 of the Greek League Finals against Panathinaikos, he recorded 25 points, 6 rebounds and 3 assists, with Olympiacos completing the domestic Double, having swept their rivals.

NBA draft rights
On 22 June 2017, Vezenkov was selected with the 57th overall pick in the 2017 NBA draft by the Brooklyn Nets. On 14 January 2021, the Cleveland Cavaliers acquired his draft rights from the Nets, in a multi-team trade involving James Harden. On June 23, 2022, his rights were traded to the Sacramento Kings for the 49th pick in 2022 draft, which became Isaiah Mobley.

National team career

Junior national team
Vezenkov was a member of the Bulgarian junior national teams. With Bulgaria's junior national teams, he played at the following tournaments: the 2010 FIBA Europe Under-16 Championship, the 2011 FIBA Europe Under-16 Championship, the 2012 FIBA Europe Under-18 Championship, the 2012 FIBA Europe Under-20 Division B Championship, and the 2013 FIBA Europe Under-18 Championship. He led the 2011 FIBA Europe Under-16 Championship in scoring, with an average of 27.1 points per game.

He led the 2013 FIBA Europe Under-18 Championship in scoring, with an average of 22.4 points per game. He also led the 2014 FIBA Europe Under-20 Championship in scoring, averaging 19.3 points per game, and rebounds, averaging 11.2 rebounds per game. He was also named to the tournament's All-Tournament Team.

Senior national team
Vezenkov also represented the senior men's Bulgarian national team in the second qualification tournament for FIBA EuroBasket 2015, averaging 17.3 points per game, and also being the highest scoring player for the team, in 5 of their 6 games, as well as the team's overall top scorer. He also played at the EuroBasket 2017 qualification as well as the team's successful qualification for EuroBasket 2022 and the actual tournament, during which he was the leading scorer for Bulgaria.

Career statistics

EuroLeague

|-
| style="text-align:left;"|2015–16
| style="text-align:left;" rowspan="3"|Barcelona
| 22 || 1 || 8.9 || .457 || .444 || 1.000 || 1.2 || .3 || .2 || .0 || 2.7 || 2.6
|-
| style="text-align:left;"|2016–17
| 30 || 6 || 18.4 || .577 || .479 || .848 || 3.2 || 1.1 || .7 ||  .2 || 7.5 || 9.7
|-
| style="text-align:left;"|2017–18
| 13 || 1 || 11.4 || .429 || .222 || .923 || 2.5 ||  .5 || .4 || .1 || 3.5 || 5.2
|-
| style="text-align:left;"|2018–19
| style="text-align:left;" rowspan="4"|Olympiacos
| 28|| 3 || 10.2 || .488 || .207 || .810 || 2.2 || .4 || .4 || .1 || 3.8 || 4.8
|-
| style="text-align:left;"|2019–20
| 26 || 3 || 13.4 || .540 || .459 || .808 || 2.0 ||  .5 || .3 || .2 || 7.1 || 6.9
|-
| style="text-align:left;"|2020–21
| 31 || 13 || 23.3 || .463 || .430 || .887 || 5.4 ||  1.1  || .7  ||  .5  || 11.5 || 14.8
|-
| style="text-align:left;"|2021–22
|  38  ||  38  ||  30.1  || .665 || .370 || .833 ||  5.9  ||   1.5  || 1  || .2  ||  13.7  || 17.8

Awards and accomplishments

Youth club career
Aris Thessaloniki
Panhellenic Junior Championship Champion: (2011)

Club career 
Barcelona
 Spanish Supercup Winner: (2015)

Olympiacos
  Greek League Champion: (2022)
  2× Greek Cup Winner: (2022, 2023)
  Greek Super Cup Winner: (2022)

Individual
 Bulgarian Sportsperson of the Year: 2022
 All-EuroLeague First Team (2022)
 3× EuroLeague MVP of the Month: (February 2022, November 2022, February 2023)
 9× EuroLeague MVP of the Round
  Eurobasket.com's EuroLeague All-European Team: (2022)
EuroBasket rebounding leader: (2022)
 2× Greek League MVP: (2015, 2022)
 Greek League Finals MVP: (2022)
 Greek Cup MVP: (2023)
 2× Greek League Top Scorer: (2015, 2022)
 2× All-Greek League Team : (2015, 2022)
 Greek League Most Popular Player: (2022)
 2× Greek League Most Improved Player: (2015, 2022)
 Greek League rebounding leader: (2015)
 Greek League All-Star MVP: (2022)
 Greek League All-Star: (2022)
 3× Greek League Best Young Player: (2013, 2014, 2015)
2× Greek Youth All-Star Game: (2013, 2014)
 Greek Super Cup Finals Top Scorer: (2022)
 Spanish League All-Young Players Team: (2017)
Panhellenic Junior Championship MVP: (2011)
Panhellenic Junior Championship Top Scorer: (2011)

Bulgarian Youth national team
FIBA Europe Under-20 Championship All-Tournament Team: (2014)
FIBA Europe Under-20 Championship rebounding leader: (2014)
FIBA Europe Under-20 Championship Top Scorer: (2014) 
FIBA Europe Under-16 Championship Top Scorer: (2011)
 FIBA Europe Under-18 Championship Top Scorer: (2013) 
 2× Best Young Basketball Player of Bulgaria:2013–14, 2014–15
 Second place in the Viasport.bg "Best Young Sportsperson of Bulgaria" rankings: 2014

Personal life
Vezenkov is the son of Yanka Vezenkova (née Gerginova) and Sashko "Sasho" Vezenkov, who has served as both head coach and director of sports of Lukoil Academic. Sasho is also a former international basketball player, who played at EuroBasket 1985, EuroBasket 1989, and EuroBasket 1991. Sasho was also the captain of the senior men's Bulgarian national basketball team. Sasho moved to Cyprus, and he played and coached basketball there in the Cypriot Basketball League for many years.

Vezenkov's older sister, Michaela Vezenkova, played college basketball at UNC Wilmington, and also played professionally in the Cypriot women's league. Vezenkova decided to represent Cyprus, rather than Bulgaria, and she eventually became the captain of the Cypriot women's national basketball team.

While living in Greece as a youth, Vezenkov attended Greek schools. Vezenkov is fluent in both the Greek and the Bulgarian languages, with Greek being his native tongue, and Bulgarian being his second language.

Vezenkov officially received Greek citizenship on 30 December 2015, under the official name of Alexander "Alex" Vezenkof (Greek: Αλεξάντερ "Αλέξ" Βεζένκοφ), with his common Greek name being Sasha Vezenkof (Greek: Σάσα Βεζένκοφ). Before acquiring Greek citizenship, Vezenkov had previously stated that he felt like a member of Greek society, since he was born and raised in Greek communities in both Cyprus and Greece.

References

External links

 Sasha Vezenkov at acb.com 
 Sasha Vezenkov at baskethotel.com
 Sasha Vezenkov at draftexpress.com
 Sasha Vezenkov at euroleague.net
 Sasha Vezenkov at eurobasket.com
 Sasho Vezenkov at fibaeurope.com
 Sasha Vezenkov at bgbasket.com 
 Sasha Vezenkov at esake.gr 
 Sasha Vezenkov at fiba.com (archive)

1995 births
Living people
Aris B.C. players
Brooklyn Nets draft picks
Bulgarian expatriate basketball people in Spain
Bulgarian men's basketball players
Cypriot expatriate basketball people in Spain
Cypriot men's basketball players
Cypriot people of Bulgarian descent
FC Barcelona Bàsquet players
Greek Basket League players
Greek expatriate basketball people in Spain
Greek men's basketball players
Greek people of Bulgarian descent
Liga ACB players
Naturalized citizens of Greece
Olympiacos B.C. players
Power forwards (basketball)
Small forwards
Sportspeople from Nicosia